Chama Rural District is in the Central District of Saman County, Chaharmahal and Bakhtiari province, Iran. At the most recent National Census of 2016, the population of the rural district was 4,784 in 1,509 households. The largest of its six villages was Cham Chang, with 1,881 people.

References 

Saman County

Rural Districts of Chaharmahal and Bakhtiari Province

Populated places in Chaharmahal and Bakhtiari Province

Populated places in Saman County

fa:دهستان چما